Hisham ibn al-Mughira (died 598) was an Arab polytheistic leader from the Banu Makhzum clan of the Quraysh tribe. He was a person of high rank among the Quraish and he was one of the commanders in the Sacrilegious War.

He was the son of al-Mughira ibn Abd Allah, one of the leaders of the Quraish. One of his daughters was Hantamah, who was the mother of Umar. By his wife Asma bint Mukharraba, he was the father of Abu Jahl, the notorious opponent of Muhammad. His brother was Walid ibn al-Mughira, making him an uncle of the famous Muslim general Khalid ibn al-Walid. Hisham was a contemporary of Muhammad.

It is believed that he died in 598.

See also
Non-Muslim interactants with Muslims during Muhammad's era
Sahaba

References

598 deaths
6th-century Arabs
Arab generals